|}

The Tetrarch Stakes is a Listed flat horse race in Ireland open to three-year-old thoroughbreds. It is run over a distance of 7 furlongs (1,408 metres) at the Curragh in early May.

History
The event is named after The Tetrarch, a successful Irish racehorse foaled in 1911. The 2021 running carried the name of Dick McCormick, an Irish racehorse trainer who was one of the few men who rode The Tetrarch in workouts.

For a period the Tetrarch Stakes held Group 3 status. It was downgraded to Listed level in 2011.

The Tetrarch Stakes can serve as a trial for the Irish 2,000 Guineas. The last horse to win both races was Awtaad in 2016.

Records

Leading jockey since 1950 (5 wins):
 Michael Kinane – Flash of Steel (1986), Big Shuffle (1987), Monashee Mountain (2000), Century City (2002), Leitrim House (2004)
 Kevin Manning - Desert Style (1995), Creachadoir (2007), Vocalised (2009), Free Judgement (2010), Lunar Space (2021)

Leading trainer since 1950 (13 wins):
 Vincent O'Brien – Harry (1968), Sahib (1969), Minsky (1971), Home Guard (1972), Dapper (1973), Cellini (1974), Achieved (1982), Salmon Leap (1983), Northern Plain (1985), Prince of Birds (1988), Saratogan (1989), Royal Academy (1990), College Chapel (1993)

Winners since 1980

Earlier winners

 1947: Sea Flower
 1948: Beau Sabreur
 1949: Solonaway
 1950: Princess Trudy
 1951: Signal Box
 1952: Stella Aurata
 1953: Treetops Hotel
 1954: Tale of Two Cities
 1955: Bright Night
 1956: Milesian
 1957: Jack Ketch
 1958: Tharp
 1959: Sovereign Path
 1960: Kythnos
 1961: Time Greine
 1962: Assurance
 1963: Vertigo
 1964: Majority Blue
 1965: Quintillian
 1966: Ultimate
 1967: Bold Lad
 1968: Harry
 1969: Sahib
 1970: El Kuntilla
 1971: Minsky
 1972: Home Guard
 1973: Dapper
 1974: Cellini
 1975: Dempsey
 1976: Poacher's Moon
 1977: Lordedaw
 1978: Columbanus
 1979: Gerald Martin

See also
 Horse racing in Ireland
 List of Irish flat horse races

References

 Paris-Turf:
 Racing Post:

 galopp-sieger.de – Tetrarch Stakes.
 horseracingintfed.com – International Federation of Horseracing Authorities – Tetrarch Stakes (2010).
 irishracinggreats.com – Tetrarch Stakes (Listed).
 pedigreequery.com – Tetrarch Stakes – Curragh.

Flat horse races for three-year-olds
Curragh Racecourse
Flat races in Ireland